Commerce High School is a public high school in Commerce, Georgia, United States.

Notable alumni
Gene White, NFL defensive back for the Green Bay Packers

References

Schools in Jackson County, Georgia
Public high schools in Georgia (U.S. state)
1955 establishments in Georgia (U.S. state)